Leucofisetinidin is a flavan-3,4-diol (leucoanthocyanidin), a type of natural phenolic substance. It is the monomer of condensed tannins called profisetinidins. Those tannins can be extracted from the heartwood of Acacia mearnsii  or from the heartwoods
of Schinopsis balansae, Schinopsis quebrachocolorado and from commercial quebracho extract.

See also 
 Fisetinidin

References 

Leucoanthocyanidins